Esteban Farias (born 27 July 1984) is a Argentinian-born Italian paracanoeist who won nine medals (four gold) at senior level between World Championships and European Championships.

Biography
He lives in Fiorenzuola d'Arda , Piacenza but trains in Cremona. He acquired his disability in 2009 (Spinal cord injuries - lower 5), at the age of 25, when he was visiting his grandmother in Argentina, falling from a four-meter high wall.

Despite having qualified for the Tokyo 2020 Paralympic Games (however, which took place in 2021 due to Covid-19), he was forced to give up due to an injury.

References

External links
 
 Esteban Farias at the Italian National Olympic Committee

1984 births
Living people
Paracanoeists of Italy